Longueuil station, officially Longueuil–Université-de-Sherbrooke station, is a Montreal Metro station in Longueuil, Quebec, Canada. It is operated by the Société de transport de Montréal (STM) and is the southern terminus of the Yellow Line. It is connected to a campus of Université de Sherbrooke.

Overview  

It is a normal side platform station, with a ticket hall installed directly at platform level on the departure platform. As a result, a new fare must be purchased to switch platforms. A commercial building has been built above the station. Longueuil–Université-de-Sherbrooke is directly connected to Terminus Longueuil, and is also connected to several neighbouring buildings through skywalks. This station has underground city access to the Université de Sherbrooke, Université de Montréal and Université Laval’s campuses, as well shopping, office and retail complexes.

Origin of name
The station was originally called Longueuil, after the city where it is located. It was renamed Longueuil–Université-de-Sherbrooke on September 26, 2003, to reflect the fact that the Université de Sherbrooke has a campus nearby. (Each Montreal-area university has its name in the nearest Metro station.)  Nevertheless, most Montrealers still use the station's original name when referring to this station.

Connecting bus routes

For bus services within Longueuil, adjacent municipalities and throughout Quebec see connecting bus routes at the terminus.

Nearby main intersections
The station is located at the junction of two major roads ( Route 132 and  Route 134) and one freeway ( Autoroute 20), near the Jacques Cartier Bridge.

Nearby points of interest
 Université de Sherbrooke, Longueuil campus
 Champlain College Saint-Lambert
 Place Longueuil

See also
 Université de Sherbrooke

References

External links
 Longueuil–Université-de-Sherbrooke station information from the STM
 Montreal by Metro, metrodemontreal.com — photos, information, and trivia
 Metro Map
 STM 2011 System Map

1967 establishments in Quebec
Yellow Line (Montreal Metro)
Transport in Longueuil
Buildings and structures in Longueuil
Railway stations in Canada opened in 1967
Railway stations in Canada at university and college campuses